The Parliament of Canada has exclusive legislative authority over marriage and divorce in Canada under section 91(26) of the Constitution Act, 1867. However section 92(12) of the Constitution Act, 1867 gives the provincial legislatures the power to pass laws regulating the solemnization of marriage.

In 2001 there were 146,618 marriages in Canada, down 6.8% from 157,395 in 2000. Prince Edward Island had the highest crude marriage rate (6.5 per 1,000 people) and Quebec had the lowest (3.0).

Marriage ceremonies in Canada can be either civil or religious. Marriages may be performed by members of the clergy, marriage commissioners, judges, justices of the peace or clerks of the court, depending on the laws of each province and territory regulating marriage solemnization. In 2001, the majority of Canadian marriages (76.4%) were religious, with the remainder (23.6%) being performed by non-clergy.

Same-sex marriage has been legal in Canada nationally since 2005.  Court decisions, starting in 2003, had already legalized same-sex marriage in eight out of ten provinces and one of three territories.

Marriage restrictions

Consanguinity
The federal Marriage (Prohibited Degrees) Act, Section 2 prevents the following persons from getting married:

Subject to subsection (2), persons related by consanguinity, affinity or adoption are not prohibited from marrying each other by reason only of their relationship.
No person shall marry another person if they are related lineally, or as brother or sister or half-brother or half-sister, including by adoption.

Consent of the spouses
Both parties must freely consent. Forcing somebody to get married  is a criminal offence under s. 293.1 of the Criminal Code. In addition, s. 2.1 of the Civil Marriage Act stipulates, "Marriage requires the free and enlightened consent of two persons to be the spouse of each other."

Age of the spouses
Since 2015, federal law has set the absolute minimum marriageable age at 16. Provinces and territories may set a minimum age higher than that. In Canada the age of majority is set by province/territory at 18 or 19, so minors under this age have additional restrictions (i.e. parental and court consent). Section 293.2 of the Criminal Code also addresses marriages of individuals under the age of 16, reading: Everyone who celebrates, aids or participates in a marriage rite or ceremony knowing that one of the persons being married is under the age of 16 years is guilty of an indictable offence and liable to imprisonment for a term not exceeding five years. Section 2.2 of the Civil Marriage Act also states: No person who is under the age of 16 years may contract marriage. These provisions were enacted in 2015. Before 2015, it was possible for children less than 16 years old to get married in some jurisdictions of Canada, with parental consent or a court order. (The legal marriage age with parental consent was possibly as low as 7 in some Canadian jurisdictions.)

Minimum age by province and territory 

 British Columbia: 19, or 16 with parental consent.
 Alberta: 18, or 16 with consent of all parents and legal guardians.
 Saskatchewan: 18, or 16 with a "Consent to Marriage of a Minor" form signed and completed by the parent(s) or guardian(s) in the presence of a Saskatchewan marriage licence issuer, clergy or any person authorized to take affidavits. "If the parent(s) or guardian(s) refuse to consent to the marriage, the minor can apply to a judge of either the provincial or Queen's Bench court for an order dispensing with their consent. The minor may obtain the judge's order by applying to a court house in Saskatchewan."
 Manitoba: 18.
 Ontario: 18, or 16 with written consent from both sets of parents.
 Quebec: 18, or 16 with authorization from the courts.
 New Brunswick: 18, or 16 with an affidavit of consent signed by parents or guardians.
 Nova Scotia: 19, or 17 with a signed consent form.
 Prince Edward Island: 18, or younger with a consent form signed by parent(s).
 Newfoundland and Labrador: 19, or younger wherein "special consents may be required."
 Yukon: 19, or younger with consent of parent(s) or legal guardian(s).
 Northwest Territories: 19, or younger with parental consent.
 Nunavut: 19, or 16 with parental consent.

Divorce

Termination of marriage in Canada is covered by the federal Divorce Act.

A divorce may be granted for one of the following reasons:
 the marriage has irretrievably broken down, and the two parties have been living apart for a year (s.8(2)(a) of the Act)
 one party has committed adultery (s.8(2)(b)(i) of the Act)
 one party has treated the other party "with physical or mental cruelty of such a kind as to render intolerable the continued cohabitation of the spouses" (s.8(2)(b)(ii) of the Act)

Key headings of the Divorce Act:

Interpretation
Jurisdiction
Divorce
Child support orders
Spousal support orders
Priority
Custody orders
Variation, rescission or suspension of orders
Provisional orders
Appeals
General

Divorce rates in Canada by year
This chart, with data from Statistics Canada, shows the amount of divorces per 100,000 residents of Canada from 1950 to 2008.

Divorce rates in Canada by year of marriage
This chart, with data from Statistics Canada, shows the amount of marriages from 1955 to 2004 that ultimately ended in divorce. The data was collected in 2004.

Polygamy

In Canada, polygamy is a criminal offence, but prosecutions are rare. In March 2014, Winston Blackmore and James Oler were charged with polygamy; their prosecutions were the first such cases in Canada in over sixty-five years. In 2007, an independent prosecutor in British Columbia recommended that Canadian courts be asked to rule on the constitutionality of laws against polygamy. The Supreme Court of British Columbia upheld Canada's polygamy laws in a 2011 reference case.

On March 9, 2018, the Supreme Court of British Columbia reaffirmed the constitutionality of Canada's anti-polygamy laws, upholding the July 2017 polygamy convictions of Winston Blackmore and James Oler.

See also
Concubinage in Canada

Notes

References